The 2014 Tour of Turkey was the 50th edition of the Presidential Cycling Tour of Turkey cycling stage race. It was held from 27 April to 4 May 2014, and was won by Adam Yates. British cyclist Mark Cavendish won four stages and the points classification.

Schedule

Teams
The start list includes 20 teams and 154 riders.
Pro Teams

 
 
 
 
 
 
 
 

Professional Continental Teams

 
 
 
 
 
 
 
 
 
 
 

Continental Teams

Stages

Stage 1
27 April 2014 — Alanya to Alanya,

Stage 2
28 April 2014 — Alanya to Kemer,

Stage 3
29 April 2014 — Finike to Elmalı,

Stage 4
30 April 2014 — Fethiye to Marmaris,

Stage 5
1 May 2014 — Marmaris to Bodrum–Turgutreis,

Stage 6
2 May 2014 — Bodrum to Selçuk,

Stage 7
3 May 2014 — Kuşadası to İzmir,

Stage 8
4 May 2014 — Istanbul to Istanbul,

Classification leadership table

References

External links

Tour of Turkey
Tour of Turkey
Presidential Cycling Tour of Turkey by year